Ellegaard is a Danish surname. Notable people with the surname include:

France Ellegaard (1913–1999), Danish pianist and music educator
Jeanne Ellegaard (born 1987), Danish curler
Kevin Stuhr-Ellegaard (born 1983), Danish football
Mogens Ellegaard (1935–1995), Danish musicians
Thorvald Ellegaard (1877–1954), Danish cyclist 

Danish-language surnames